Scuba Duba is a 1967 comedy play from Bruce Jay Friedman which was a success off-Broadway starring Jerry Orbach, Judd Hirsch, Conrad Bain and Cleavon Little in a production that ran for 692 performances.  

The play was profiled in the William Goldman book The Season: A Candid Look at Broadway.

Although the play did not run on Broadway, it had a second well received run in 1971 at the Studio Arena Theater in Buffalo starring F. Murray Abraham, John Newton, and Eve McVeagh.

References

External links
Scuba Duba at Internet Off Broadway Database

1967 plays
Plays by Bruce Jay Friedman